Dorothy Park Benjamin Caruso (August 6, 1893 –  December 16, 1955) was an American socialite and the wife of the Italian operatic tenor Enrico Caruso.

Life 
Born Dorothy Park Benjamin on August 6, 1893 in Hastings-on-Hudson, New York, she was the daughter of Park Benjamin, a wealthy lawyer and author, and Ida Crane. Dorothy had two sisters and two brothers.

On August 20, 1918, Benjamin married Enrico Caruso, with whom she had a daughter, Gloria Caruso (1919-1999). After the death of Enrico Caruso on August 2, 1921, Dorothy married Captain Ernest Augustus Ingram (1892–1954) in 1923. They had a daughter, Jacqueline, born in September 1924, and were divorced in 1925. She then married Charles Adam Holder (1872–1955) in Paris in 1933. They divorced in 1940. She reverted to the surname "Caruso" following the dissolution of both marriages.

Dorothy Caruso died of cancer in Baltimore, Maryland on December 16, 1955 at the age of 62. She was interred in Druid Ridge Cemetery, Baltimore County, Maryland.

Books 
Dorothy Caruso wrote two biographies of her husband: Wings Of Song: The Story Of Caruso published in 1928, and Enrico Caruso: His Life and Death published in 1945. The latter book  was a bestseller and the basis for the screenplay of the 1951 Metro-Goldwyn-Mayer motion picture The Great Caruso, starring  Mario Lanza in the title role. Dorothy Caruso was portrayed in the film by Ann Blyth.

Her autobiography, Dorothy Caruso: A Personal History, was published in 1952.

References

1893 births
1955 deaths
Writers from New York (state)
20th-century American women writers
20th-century American biographers
American women biographers
Deaths from cancer in Maryland
People from Hastings-on-Hudson, New York
Enrico Caruso